Bob Fisher was born in 1961 and is an American screenwriter whose credits include Wedding Crashers, the 2011 Fox comedy series Traffic Light, and We're the Millers. He is a co-writer and co-executive producer for the US adaptation of Sirens.

In 2014, he spoke at an event at Cal State Long Beach's Hall of Science; he talked about how he became a screenwriter. He said that he considered attending law school after college but instead became a bartender. While a student he read an article about television writers and how well they were paid. This gave him the idea to begin writing his own scripts for practice. His first screenwriting job was in 1995 for The Bonnie Hunt Show.

His latest film, We're the Millers, took 12 years to make and generated more than $270 million at the box office.

Filmography

Films

Television

References

External links

Living people
Year of birth missing (living people)
Place of birth missing (living people)
American screenwriters